Giovanni Parmigiani is a biostatistician. He is a professor of biostatistics at both the Dana–Farber Cancer Institute and the Harvard T.H. Chan School of Public Health, and is also associate director for population sciences at the Dana-Farber/Harvard Cancer Center. He is a fellow of the American Statistical Association. In 2009 he and his co-author Lurdes Inoue received a DeGroot Prize from the International Society for Bayesian Analysis for their book Decision Theory: Principles and Approaches.

References

Harvard School of Public Health faculty
Biostatisticians
Living people
Italian statisticians
Year of birth missing (living people)
Fellows of the American Statistical Association